Sian Morris (born 16 June 1965) is a retired Welsh sprinter.

At the 1986 Commonwealth Games, the most successful games for Wales ever, she won a bronze medal in the 4 × 100 metres relay together with Helen Miles, Sallyanne Short and Carmen Smart. She also finished seventh in the 200 metres, Wales' best ever placement in this event, and competed in the 400 metres without reaching the final.

Morris also became Welsh champion in the 400 metres in 1985 and 1986. Her personal best time in this event was 52.80 seconds, achieved in Finland in 1983 breaking the Welsh under 20 record, a record which is still held.  She competed for Great Britain in the European junior championships in 1983. 
.

References

1966 births
Living people
Welsh female sprinters
Athletes (track and field) at the 1986 Commonwealth Games
Commonwealth Games bronze medallists for Wales
Commonwealth Games medallists in athletics
Medallists at the 1986 Commonwealth Games